Two Tactics of Social Democracy in the Democratic Revolution is one of the most important of Lenin's early writings.

Background
It was written in June and July 1905, while the Russian Revolution of 1905 was taking place.

Content 

Lenin's preface poses a certain question: "in educating and organising the working class;...where should we place the main political emphasis in this work of education and organisation? On the trade unions and legally existing associations, or on an insurrection, on the work of creating a revolutionary army and a revolutionary government?"

See also 

 Vladimir Lenin bibliography

External links 
 Two Tactics of Social Democracy in the Social Revolution by Vladimir Lenin at the Marxists Internet Archive

Works by Vladimir Lenin